Eternal is the fourth and final studio album by the British R&B group Eternal, released in November 1999. It was the first album they recorded without former member Kéllé Bryan, who was withdrawn from the group in 1998. The album had very little promotion, only peaking at #87 on the UK Albums Chart, but was praised for its more modern R&B sound.

"What'cha Gonna Do" was the only single to be released from the album and it gave Eternal their last Top 20 hit. "I Cry Real Tears" was due to be the second single from the album, however its release was cancelled and they parted ways with EMI in early 2000.
Eternal also recorded a Spanish version of "Free to live", called "Libre para vivir", which was released as a promotional single in Spain.

Track listing 

Notes
 denotes additional producer
 denotes co-producer

Personnel 

 Keith Andes – vocal & backing vocal production
 Alison Bailey – strings
 Zuille Bailey – strings
 The Beatmasters – remix, additional production
 Vernie Bennett – producer, vocal production
 Kevin "KD" Davis – mixing
 Lawrence P. Dermer – mixing
 Emilio Estefan Jr. – Producer
 Charles Farrar – producer
 Ben Garrison – mix engineer
 J-Dub – producer
 Tim Kelley – producer
 Steven "Stevie J" Jordan – producer

 Anthony Lowe – co-producer
 Andrew Lyn – assistant engineer
 Andy Marvel – producer
 Mike Mason – producer, co-producer
 Elizabeth Nielsen – strings
 Bob Robinson – producer
 Dexter Simmons – mixing
 Brian Smith – engineer
 Barry Stern – strings
 T-Money – scratches
 Chris Theis – engineer
 Troy Taylor – producer

Charts

References 

Eternal (band) albums
1999 albums
Albums produced by Tim & Bob